Giacomo Gesino (27 January 1918 – 18 February 2003) was an Italian wrestler. He competed in the men's Greco-Roman lightweight at the 1948 Summer Olympics.

References

External links
 

1918 births
2003 deaths
Italian male sport wrestlers
Olympic wrestlers of Italy
Wrestlers at the 1948 Summer Olympics
Sportspeople from Genoa